Agonum ferreum is a species of ground beetle from Platyninae subfamily, that can be found in the United States.

References

Beetles described in 1843
ferreum
Endemic fauna of the United States
Beetles of North America